The 1982 Dutch TT was the sixth round of the 1982 Grand Prix motorcycle racing season. It took place on the weekend of 25–26 June 1982 at the TT Circuit Assen located in Assen, Netherlands.

Classification

500 cc

References

Dutch TT
Dutch
Tourist Trophy